William L. Brown may refer to:

William L. Brown (geneticist) (1913–1991), American geneticist
William L. Brown (politician) (1840–1906), Ohio and New York politician
William Laurence Brown (1755–1830), Scottish divine (theologian)
William Lincoln Brown (1862–1940), second Register of Copyrights in the United States Copyright Office
William Liston Brown (1842–1929), American industrialist
William Little Brown (1789–1830), justice of the Tennessee Supreme Court

See also
William Brown (disambiguation)